The Mercury Turnpike Cruiser is a series of automobiles that were produced by the Mercury division of Ford for the 1957 and 1958 model years.  Named to commemorate the creation of the Interstate Highway System, the Turnpike Cruiser was marketed as the flagship Mercury model line, slotted above the Montclair when Mercury was positioned upmarket to luxury status when Edsel was introduced in 1958.

The Turnpike Cruiser was produced as a luxury two-door and a four-door hardtop sedan.  During the 1957 model year, a convertible (called the Convertible Cruiser) was offered on a limited basis, serving as one of the first replica pace cars for the Indianapolis 500 auto race.  Mercury fitted the Turnpike Cruiser with a wide variety of advanced features for the time of its production, including a retractable rear window marketed as the "Breezeway", compound-curve windshield, mechanical pushbutton transmission controls and a trip computer.

In total, 23,268 examples of the Turnpike Cruiser were produced over two years.  For 1959, Mercury discontinued the Turnpike Cruiser, phasing its content into the Park Lane product line.

Model overview
The Turnpike Cruiser derives its name from the 1956 Mercury XM-Turnpike Cruiser concept car, a two-door hardtop which largely served as a preview of the 1957 Mercury model line.  For 1957, the Turnpike Cruiser was offered as the premium top level Mercury model line with a similar approach to luxury shared with the updated four passenger Ford Thunderbird with a listed retail price of US$3,758 for the coupe ($ in  dollars ) and US$4,103 for the convertible ($ in  dollars ) and was marketed against the Buick Roadmaster and Oldsmobile 98. The Turnpike Cruiser was a body-on-frame chassis while the Thunderbird had unibody construction.  For 1958, the Turnpike Cruiser was phased into the Montclair line, and the premium top level role was given to the newly introduced Park Lane.

Chassis 
The Turnpike Cruiser shared its rear-wheel drive chassis with the Monterey and Montclair, using a 122-inch wheelbase.  Using body-on frame construction, the front axle of the Turnpike Cruiser was fitted with independent ball-joint front suspension with coil springs; the live rear axle was fitted with leaf springs.  11-inch drum brakes were fitted to all four wheels.

For 1958, the chassis (using a 124-inch wheelbase) was adopted by Edsel for its premium Corsair and Citation model lines.

Powertrain 
For 1957, the Turnpike Cruiser was fitted with a 368 cubic-inch V8, producing 290 hp.  Sharing its name with the car, the 290-hp engine was offered as an option across the rest of the Mercury line.  For 1958, two all-new "Marauder" engines were introduced.  The standard engine (shared with the Montclair and Colony Park) was a 383 cubic-inch V8, producing 330 hp.  A 430 cubic-inch version (shared with the Park Lane) produced 360 hp.  As a special order option, a triple-two barrel carburetor "Super Marauder" version of the 430 V8 produced 400 hp.  Exclusive to Mercury, the Super Marauder was the first factory-produced engine with a 400 hp output as a response to the 1957 Chrysler 300C.

All Turnpike Cruiser engines were paired with a 3-speed "Merc-O-Matic" automatic.  For 1957, Mercury offered mechanically activated pushbutton transmission controls in response to the Chrysler TorqueFlite pushbutton controls introduced in 1956. The Mercury control buttons initially offered five buttons and was called "Keyboard Control", with a long button on top labeled "Drive" with four smaller buttons below labeled "Brake", "Neutral Start" which would allow the engine to start with the ignition key, "Hill Control" and "Reverse" with later versions separating the "Drive" button to "Performance" and "Cruising" for 1958 and relabeled as "Multi-Drive". A separate push/pull lever was included below the control buttons labeled "Park" which would lock out the control buttons until the Park button was pulled to release it. The control panel was installed to the left of the steering wheel. In 1959 the keyboard control was discontinued and used a steering column gear selector lever.

Body 

During its production, the Turnpike Cruiser was offered as a two-door and four-door hardtop.  To serve as the pace car for the 1957 Indianapolis 500, a convertible was created (named the Convertible Cruiser), leading Mercury to offer a version for sale.  Effectively one of the first replica pace cars, the Convertible Cruiser was offered in a single yellow (Sun Glitter) exterior color and were fitted with the optional continental tire kit.

The installation of a hood ornament had become commonplace during this time, and the Turnpike Cruiser was no exception. However, Mercury also installed one outside and at the base of the rear window for 1957, then relocated it inside next to the rear window where it would light up if the exterior lights were on and did not serve the function of a third brake light.

While sharing much of its body with the Montclair, the Turnpike Cruiser was distinguished by several exterior design features.  Although not legalized across the entire United States until 1958, "Quadri-Beam" dual headlamps were fitted as standard equipment (the only 1957 Mercury to do so, as well as one of very few cars from that year to be equipped as such); for states that still allowed the use of single headlights only, the Turnpike Cruiser also used the then-standard singles setup.  In place of contrasting paint, the scalloped tailfins were gold-anodized.  Distinguished by its retractable "Breezeway" rear window, the Turnpike Cruiser received a separate roofline, along with a windshield curving into the roof; the windshield was among the first to use tint to reduce solar glare.  As a consequence of the compound-curve design of the windshield, Mercury added rooftop ventilation intakes to the Turnpike Cruiser to cover a body seam, and unusually in a secondary function, each intake also housed a fake radio antenna, as the functional radio antenna was mounted on the passenger side front fender.  Coupled with the retractable rear window, the Turnpike Cruiser was among the first cars to offer flow-through ventilation; air conditioning and power side windows were additional cost options.  For 1958, the Turnpike Cruiser adapted the styling changes of the Montclair and Monterey, shifting the grilles into the front bumper.  The rear fascia multiple changes, as the gold-anodized trim was removed from the scalloped fins; "rocket-style" taillamps were added.  To distinguish the model line from the Montclair (and Park Lane), the Turnpike Cruiser was given gold trim for its badging (including the Mercury "M" grille badge).

The interior of the Turnpike Cruiser offered several features distinct from other Mercury sedans.  To aid forward visibility, a flat-top deep-dish steering wheel was fitted (to match the curve of the instrument panel).  Alongside a tachometer ("to measure engine efficiency"), the instrument panel was fitted with a clock to calculate average speed and a trip odometer (effectively, a trip computer).  One of the first memory seats, "Seat-O-Matic" was programmable and moved down and back when the ignition was off.  While not equipped with cruise control, in 1958, the Turnpike Cruiser (alongside all Mercurys) was introduced with a programmable speed warning, setting off a warning if a preset speed was exceeded.

The Turnpike Cruiser standardized several Mercury safety features, including a padded dashboard (and dashboard gauges), a deep-dish flat-top steering wheel, and safety door locks; seatbelts were optional, alongside a safety harness for children.  Nearly 10 years before their introduction, the design of the taillamps performed as side marker lamps.

Design epilogue

While the Turnpike Cruiser was produced only for two years, elements of its design would be adopted across several other Lincoln-Mercury vehicles.  For 1958, Lincoln introduced the Continental Mark III; to distinguish it from the standard Lincoln, the Mark III was fitted with a retractable rear window on all body styles (including convertibles) borrowed from Mercury station wagons.  While using a similar roofline as the Turnpike Cruiser, Continental used a reverse-slant rear window.

For 1959, following the discontinuation of the Turnpike Cruiser, Mercury designated its hardtop roofline as a Hardtop Cruiser, with all Park Lanes (except convertibles) produced as hardtops.  A compound-curved rear window was introduced, creating a fastback roofline, adopted by the 1960s Mercury Marauder and Mercury S-55.

Following the 1960 Continental Mark V, Lincoln discontinued the retractable rear window design feature.  For 1963, the design feature was revived by Mercury, making a reverse-slant retractable rear window standard on its full-size sedans (including the Monterey, Montclair, S-55, and Park Lane).  In 1965, the roofline became an option and was discontinued after 1966.

For 2001, the Ford Explorer Sport Trac mid-size pickup truck adopted a retractable rear window between the cab and cargo area.  While vertical in design, the Sport Trac used a retracting center portion in line with the previous Mercury and Lincoln designs.

Sales

References

Turnpike Cruiser
Cars introduced in 1957